Koikküla is a settlement in Valga Parish, Valga County in southeastern Estonia.

References

External links 
Satellite map at Maplandia.com

Villages in Valga County
Valga Parish
Kreis Werro